Willie Sparks was a former drummer for the band Graham Central Station. He has also sung vocals and played drums for other artists, including Sly & The Family Stone and Elton John. Willie Sparks died on May 23, 2020.

From 1994 to 2011, Sparks was homeless off and on, living in the San Francisco, California area.

References

Living people
Year of birth missing (living people)